Angelica is a genus of herbs, especially the cultivated species Angelica archangelica

Angelica or Angélica may also refer to:

Arts and media

Film and television
 Angelica (1939 film), a French-Italian film
 Angelica (2015 film), a 2015 American film
 Angelica (2016 film), a 2016 Puerto Rico film
 Angélica (TV series), a Mexican telenovela
 Angelica Pickles, in the Rugrats franchise

Literature
 Angelica (character), in Italian Renaissance literature
 Angelica, a 2003 novel by Sharon Shinn
 Angelica, a 2007 novel by Arthur Phillips

Music and dance

Songs and compositions
 L'Angelica (Porpora), 1720 serenata by Porpora
 L'Angelica (Carvalho), 1778 serenata by Carvalho
 Angelica (album), a 1988 album by Nels Cline
 "Angelica", recorded by Barry Mann, Gene Pitney, The Sandpipers, Scott Walker, and Oliver, original version of "La Musique"
 "Angelica", on the Anathema album Eternity
 "Angelica", on the Lamb album Between Darkness and Wonder
 "Angelica", on the Moi Dix Mois album Dixanadu

Other uses in music and dance
 Angelica (dance), in ancient Greece
 Angelica (band), a punk rock band from Lancaster, England
 Angelica (singer) (born 1972), Latin pop singer active in the 1990s

People
 Angelica (given name), a female given name derived from Latin angelicus meaning "angelic"
 Angelica (singer) (born 1972), Latin pop singer active in the 1990s
 Angélica (television host) (born 1973), Brazilian television host

Places
 Angelica, New York, a town in Allegany County
 Angelica (village), New York, within the above town
 Angelica, Wisconsin, a town in Shawano County
 Angelica (CDP), Wisconsin, in Shawano County
 Angelica Creek (Pennsylvania), a tributary of the Schuylkill River in Berks County, Pennsylvania
 Angélica, Mato Grosso do Sul, a municipality in Brazil

Other uses 
 Angelica wine, a historic sweet fortified wine
 Angelica vestis, garments

See also 
 Angelico (disambiguation)
 Angelika (disambiguation)
 Angelique (disambiguation)